The Oceania Baseball Championship is contested between participating baseball federations in Oceania. It is sanctioned by the Baseball Confederation of Oceania (BCO).

In , the New Zealand team withdrew from the tournament, giving Australia an automatic berth into the Final qualifying tournament for the 2008 Olympic Games.

Tournament results 

Notes

See also 
Baseball at the Pacific Games
Baseball awards#Oceania

References

External links 
Baseball Confederation of Oceania

International baseball competitions in Oceania
Baseball
Recurring sporting events established in 1999
Recurring sporting events disestablished in 2007
1999 establishments in Oceania
2007 disestablishments in Oceania